Leo Alexander Fohl (November 28, 1876 – October 30, 1965) was an American manager in Major League Baseball for the Cleveland Indians, St. Louis Browns, and Boston Red Sox.

Biography
Born in Lowell, Ohio, Fohl's involvement in professional baseball began in the early 1900s, when he served as a catcher for minor-league clubs in Ohio. His subsequent major-league playing career consisted of just five games as a catcher and 17 at-bats over two seasons. In 1915, he took over as manager of the Indians, with his best finish coming in 1918 when the Tribe finished in second place behind the Red Sox.  He never made an important move, however, without consulting Tris Speaker, who arrived via a trade with Boston in the same year Fohl took over.  In 1919, Fohl resigned as the Indians' manager after 78 games, and Speaker stepped in as manager for the remainder of the season.

Fohl resurfaced in 1921 with the Browns, where in 1922 the team was only eliminated from the pennant race on the penultimate game of the season, finishing just one game behind the New York Yankees.  When the 1923 Browns fell back closer (but still above) .500, he was fired in midseason.  In 1924, he joined the Red Sox, where he finished his managerial career on a dismal note; his Red Sox teams never finished higher than seventh place. (In fact, he was the only man to manage in the American League between 1924 and 1926 and not be enshrined in the Hall of Fame.)  He finished with a 713-792 (.474 winning percentage) as manager. He managed the Toronto Maple Leafs of the International League in 1927, but was fired mid-way through the season.

He died in Brooklyn, Ohio at age 88.

Managerial record

References

External links
Baseball-Reference.com – career managing record

1876 births
1965 deaths
Baseball managers
Cleveland Indians managers
St. Louis Browns managers
Boston Red Sox managers
Pittsburgh Pirates players
Cincinnati Reds players
Toronto Maple Leafs (International League) managers
Ohio State League Managers
Des Moines Undertakers players
Binghamton Bingoes players
Youngstown Ohio Works players
Columbus Senators players
Lima Cigarmakers players
Akron Champs players
Akron Rubbermen players
Huntington Blue Sox players
Waterbury Contenders players
People from Brooklyn, Ohio
People from Washington County, Ohio
Baseball coaches from Ohio